Félix Henri Duquesnel (2 July 1832 – 28 April 1915) was a French journalist, playwright and novelist.

Biography 
He studied at the College Rollin, then at the Faculty of Law and was admitted to the bar which he quickly left to turn to journalism.

A journalist at L'Illustration, Je sais tout or Le Gaulois among other newspapers, Duquesne was theatre manager of the Théâtre de l'Odéon from 1866, of the Théâtre du Châtelet (with Émile Rochard) (1880-1882), then of the Théâtre de la Porte Saint-Martin from 1884 to 1893. His plays were presented on the most significant Parisian stages of his time, including the Théâtre Sarah Bernhardt, the Théâtre du Vaudeville, and the Théâtre des Capucines.

He left an important correspondence with numerous personalities of the nineteenth century such as Émile Augier, Gustave Flaubert, Sainte-Beuve, Jules Sandeau, Adolphe d'Ennery, Xavier de Montépin, Jules Verne, Alexandre Dumas, Georges Sand.

Works

Theatre 
1903: La Peur, one-act comedy
1906: La maîtresse de piano, play in five acts and 6 tableaux preceded by a prologue, with André Barde
1907: Patachon, four-act comedy, with Maurice Hennequin
1907: Le Cavalier Pioche, one-act play
1909: La saison russe à Paris
1911: Sa Fille, four-act comedy, with Barde

Novels 
1895: Le Roman d'une fleuriste, Ollendorff
1904: Contes des dix mille et deux nuits, Flammarion
1905: Le mystère de Gaude, Calmann-Lévy
1909: Monsieur Roussignac, policier, Juven
1910: A la flamme de Paris, Fasquelle
1913: La bande des habits noirs, Fasquelle

Other 
 L'alphabet rationnel, étude sur l'alphabétisme et la graphie de la langue française, Delagrave, 1897
 Souvenirs littéraires : George Sand, Alexandre Dumas, souvenirs intimes, Plon-Nourrit, posth., 1922

Bibliography 
 , Les souvenirs de Félix Duquesnel, Bulletin de la  n° 132, (p. 27-31)
 Elsa de Lavergne, La naissance du roman policier français, 2009, (p. 320) ,

References

External links 
 Félix Duquesnel on Data.bnf.fr 

19th-century French journalists
French male journalists
20th-century French dramatists and playwrights
19th-century French novelists
20th-century French novelists
French theatre managers and producers
1832 births
Writers from Paris
1915 deaths
19th-century French male writers
20th-century French male writers